20th Century Masters – The Millennium Collection: The Best of the Waitresses is a compilation album from the Waitresses. Released by Polydor Records in 2003, it consists of the same tracks and uses the same running order as a previous compilation, The Best of the Waitresses (1990), minus the songs "Jimmy Tomorrow" (from Wasn't Tomorrow Wonderful?, 1982), "The Smartest Person I Know" (from I Could Rule the World If I Could Only Get the Parts EP, 1982) and "They're All Out of Liquor, Let's Find Another Party" (from Bruiseology, 1983).

Track listing

References

2003 greatest hits albums
The Waitresses compilation albums
Polydor Records compilation albums
Waitresses